Jeanne-Catherine Van Goethem (1720–1776) was a Flemish poet. She was a well known and celebrated poet in her time, and was particularly known for her poem written for the 200th anniversary of the Martyrs of Gorkum. Several of her manuscripts survive. Her production is described as strongly affected by Flemish patriotism and a great love of arts.

References

 Biographie Nationale Tome 19

1720 births
1776 deaths
Writers of the Austrian Netherlands
18th-century poets